This is a listing of the horses that finished in either first, second, or third place in the Breeders' Cup Juvenile, a grade one race run on dirt held on Saturday of the Breeders' Cup World Thoroughbred Championships.

See also

 Breeders' Cup Juvenile
 Breeders' Cup World Thoroughbred Championships

References
 Breeders' Cup official website

External links 
Official Breeders' Cup website

Juvenile
Lists of horse racing results